Geneva is a studio album by the Love of Life Orchestra. It was released in 1980 under the Infidelity (Lust/Unlust Music) label.

Track listing
"Cry Like a Baby, Sing Like a Dog" 6:50
"Tight Ropes" 4:20
"Young Girls" 6:40
"Bugsy" 3:19
"Diamond Lane" 2:29
"Ordinary People" 2:45
"Lament" 6.45
"The Revolution Is Personal" 4:59
"Extra Dik" 3:30

Personnel
Peter Laurence Gordon - Keyboards, Saxophone, Producer, Performer, Musical Director      
Randy Gun - Guitar, Electronic Mandolin                                                      
Larry Saltzman - Guitar  
Al Scotti - Bass (Electric)
David Van Tieghem - Percussion, Drums, Producer, Musical Director
Jean Ristori - Engineer

References

1980 albums
Love of Life Orchestra albums